KCCK-FM is a public radio station licensed to Kirkwood Community College in Cedar Rapids-Iowa City, Iowa. KCCK is Iowa's only jazz radio station.

KCCK-FM broadcasts in HD.

History
KCCK started out as a 1972 project in an electronics class at Kirkwood Community College. The same year a license was granted and the station broadcast, albeit sporadically for the first 3 years. In 1975 KUNI donated its 1945 transmitter to KCCK and KCCK built a larger tower.

Broadcasting
Jazz, Blues, news and informational programming from American Public Media, besides 12 hours of blues and nine hours of new age/ambient, Native American and Celtic music per week.

See also
 List of jazz radio stations in the United States

References

External links
KCCK's Website

CCK
Jazz radio stations in the United States
NPR member stations
Radio stations established in 1972